are a group of volcanic mountains on the western coast of Hokkaidō (暑寒別岳連峰). It is part of the Mashike Mountains, separated from the other part of the Mashike Mountains to the south, the Kabato Mountains by the Hamamasu River. To the north lie the Teshio Mountains. Shokanbetsudake mountains are part of Shokanbetsu-Teuri-Yagishiri Quasi-National Park.

The peaks of the Shokanbetsudake Mountains include the following:
 Mount Shokanbetsu (1492m)
 Mount Kunbetsu (1376m)
 Mount Okutoppu (1346m)
 Mount Hamamasu (1258m)
 Mount Minami Shokan (1257m)
 Mount Ofuyu (1198m)
 Mount Etai (1060m)

Flora and fauna
Unlike on Honshū, you can see alpine plants at altitudes as low as 1000 meters in the Mashike mountains.

References

Mountain ranges of Hokkaido